ISO 9362 is an international standard for Business Identifier Codes (BIC), a unique identifier for business institutions, approved by the International Organization for Standardization (ISO). BIC is also known as SWIFT-BIC, SWIFT ID, or SWIFT code, after the Society for Worldwide Interbank Financial Telecommunication (SWIFT), which is designated by ISO as the BIC registration authority. BIC was defined originally as Bank Identifier Code and is most often assigned to financial organizations; when it is assigned to non-financial organization, the code may also be known as Business Entity Identifier (BEI). These codes are used when transferring money between banks, particularly for international wire transfers, and also for the exchange of other messages between banks. The codes can sometimes be found on account statements.

The overlapping issue between ISO 9362 and ISO 13616 is discussed in the article International Bank Account Number (also called IBAN). The SWIFT network does not require a specific format for the transaction so the identification of accounts and transaction types is left to agreements of the transaction partners. In the process of the Single Euro Payments Area the European central banks have agreed on a common format based on IBAN and BIC including an XML-based transmission format for standardized transactions. TARGET2 is a joint gross clearing system in the European Union that does not require the SWIFT network for transmission (see EBICS). The TARGET directory lists all the BICs of the banks that are attached to the TARGET2-network being a subset of the SWIFT-directory of BICs.

History 
There are five versions.
 ISO 9362:1987, from year 1987, withdrawn
 ISO 9362:1994, from year 1994, withdrawn
 ISO 9362:2009, from year 2009, withdrawn
 ISO 9362:2014, from year 2014, withdrawn
 ISO 9362:2022, from year 2022, valid
ISO 9362 is based on the industry standard created by SWIFT around 1975.

Structure 
The previous edition is ISO 9362:2009 (dated 2009-10-01). The SWIFT code is 8 or 11 characters, made up of:
 4 letters: institution code or bank code.
 2 letters: ISO 3166-1 alpha-2 country code (exceptionally, SWIFT has assigned the code XK to Republic of Kosovo, which does not have an ISO 3166-1 country code)
 2 letters or digits: location code
 if the second character is "0", then it is typically a test BIC as opposed to a BIC used on the live network.
 if the second character is "1", then it denotes a passive participant in the SWIFT network
 if the second character is "2", then it typically indicates a reverse billing BIC, where the recipient pays for the message as opposed to the more usual mode whereby the sender pays for the message.
 3 letters or digits: branch code, optional ('XXX' for primary office)

Where an eight digit code is given, it may be assumed that it refers to the primary office.

SWIFT Standards, a division of The Society for Worldwide Interbank Financial Telecommunication (SWIFT), handles the registration of these codes. Because SWIFT originally introduced what was later standardized as Business Identifier Codes (BICs), they are still often called SWIFT addresses or codes.

The 2009 update of ISO 9362 broadened the scope to include non-financial institutions; before then BIC was commonly understood to be an acronym for Bank Identifier Code.

There are over 7,500 "live" codes (for partners actively connected to the SWIFT network) and an estimated 10,000 additional BIC codes which can be used for manual transactions.

2009 version is now replaced by the latest edition (ISO 9362:2014 dated 2014-12-01).

Examples
Deutsche Bank  is an international bank, with its head office in Frankfurt, Germany. The SWIFT code for its primary office is DEUTDEFF:
 DEUT identifies Deutsche Bank
 DE is the country code for Germany
 FF is the code for Frankfurt
Deutsche Bank uses an extended code of 11 characters and has assigned branches or processing areas individual extended codes. This allows the payment to be directed to a specific office. For example, DEUTDEFF500 would direct the payment to an office of Deutsche Bank in Bad Homburg.

Nedbank is a primarily South African bank, with its head office in Johannesburg. The SWIFT code for its primary office is NEDSZAJJ:
 NEDS identifies Nedbank
 ZA is the country code for South Africa
 JJ is the code for Johannesburg
Nedbank has not implemented the extended code of 11 characters and all SWIFT transfers to its accounts are directed to the primary office for processing. Those transfer interfaces that require an 11 digit code would enter NEDSZAJJXXX.

Danske Bank is a primarily Danish bank, with its head office in Copenhagen. The SWIFT code for its primary office is DABADKKK:
 DABA identifies Danske Bank
 DK is the country code for Denmark
 KK is the code for Copenhagen.

UniCredit Banca is a primarily Italian bank with its head office in Milan.
The SWIFT code for its primary office is UNCRITMM:
 UNCR identifies Unicredit Banca
 IT is the country code for Italy
 MM is the code for Milan.

Dah Sing Bank is a bank based in Hong Kong that has five branches in mainland China (primary mainland China branch in Shenzhen).
The SWIFT code for the branch in Shanghai is DSBACNBXSHA.
 DSBA identifies Dah Sing Bank
 CN is the country code for China
 BXSHA is the code for Shanghai.
It uses the 11-digit extended code, and SHA identifies the Shanghai branch.

BDO Unibank is the biggest bank in the Philippines, with its head office in Makati. The SWIFT Code for BDO is BNORPHMM. All BDO branches have the same SWIFT Code.

BNOR identifies BDO Unibank
PH is the country code for the Philippines
MM is the code for Metro Manila of which Makati is a part.

Note that one bank can seem to have more than one bank identifier in a given country for separation purposes. Bank of East Asia separates its representative branch in the US and its US-based operations for local customers into BEASUS33xxx (following the code used in its home country) and BEAKUS33xxx respectively. This differs from its local mainland China operations which are also BEASCNxxxxx following Hong Kong rather than having a separate identifier code.

 An example of this is Bank of America in the United States. For US Dollar denominated wires, its SWIFT code is BOFAUS3N. The SWIFT code for wires sent in foreign currency (non-U.S. dollars) to Bank of America in the United States is BOFAUS6S.

In the past, SEPA payments required both BIC and IBAN. Since 2016-02-01 only the IBAN is needed inside the SEPA (European Union and some more countries).

Twelve-character SWIFTNet FIN address based on BIC
To identify endpoints on its network, SWIFT also uses twelve-character codes that are derived from the BIC of the institution. Such a code consists of the 'BIC8', followed by a one-character code that identifies the Logic Terminal (LT), (also referred to as "local destination" or "Logic Terminal address"), and the three-character branch code. While 'BIC12's are not part of the ISO standard, and are only relevant in the context of the messaging platform, they play a role in FIN system messaging.  According to SWIFT, Logic Terminals are the "entity through which users send and receive FIN messages.", thus, may play a role within routing of the message.

Usage 
Business Identifier Codes are primarily used for identifying financial and non-financial institutions involving day-to-day business transactions among one or more institutions in transaction lifecycle.

Example: In SWIFT messages these BICs are embedded within the messages. Consider the message type for cash transfer MT103, here we can find BIC under different tags like 50a (ordering customer), 56a (intermediary), 57a (account with institution), etc.

See also

 Bank account
 Bank Identification Number (BIN)
 International Bank Account Number (IBAN)
 Society for Worldwide Interbank Financial Telecommunication (SWIFT)
 Cross-Border Inter-Bank Payments System (China International Payments System) (CIPS)
 Value transfer system
 Financial Stability Board
 Legal Entity Identifier
 Data Universal Numbering System

References

External links
 ISO 9362:2014 Banking -- Banking telecommunication messages -- Business identifier code (BIC)

1975 introductions
09362
Bank Identifier Codes
Financial regulation
Financial metadata
ISO 9362 SWIFT BIC codes
Company identification numbers